Quelimane Airport is an airport in Quelimane, Mozambique .

Airlines and destinations

Statistics

Accidents and incidents
On  23 February 1944 a Lockheed L-14 CR-AAV of DETA - Direcção de Exploração de Transportes Aéreos crashed on takeoff at Quelimane Airport, killing all 13 on board.

On 21 April 1988, Douglas C-47A N47FE of African Air Carriers was damaged beyond economic repair in a take-off accident. Both crew were killed, one other person on board was seriously injured. The aircraft may have been shot down.

On  27 March 1983 a Boeing 737-200 C9-BAB LAM Mozambique Airlines had an Undercarriage failure after landing some 400 metres (1,300 ft) short of the runway at Quelimane Airport. All 110 on board survived.

References

Airports in Mozambique
Buildings and structures in Zambezia Province